Desning Hall was a manor house in Risbridge Hundred, in Suffolk, England, dating from Anglo-Saxon times. Desning Hall's last resident was Sidney Arthur King who left the property in 1927. The house then stood vacant, becoming derelict, until the early 1980s when it was demolished.

External links
Desning Hall Farm; The National Archives
BARN AT THE NORTH WEST CORNER OF THE FARMSTEAD AT DESNING HALL; Historic England

Country houses in Suffolk
Gazeley